Persicaria meisneriana is a flowering plant species in the family Polygonaceae.

References

meisneriana